Yao Wen-chih (born 4 December 1965) is a Taiwanese politician also known by the appropriated Tsou name Pasuya Yao.  A member of the Democratic Progressive Party, he served in the Legislative Yuan from 2012 to 2018.

Political career
Yao, a former journalist, was named the minister of the Government Information Office in March 2005. By 2006, he had stepped down.

2014 Taipei City mayoral campaign
Yao ran for the mayoralty of Taipei City in the 2014 local elections. He won the first round of a party primary held in May, but lost to independent candidate Ko Wen-je in an opinion poll held the next month. The Democratic Progressive Party chose to back Ko's independent bid for the office, and he defeated Kuomintang candidate Sean Lien.

2016 Republic of China legislative election
On 16 January 2016, Yao won the legislative election for Taipei City 2nd constituency representing Shilin District and Datong District.

Yao announced that he would contest the Taipei mayoralty for the second time in July 2017. He resigned from the legislature in November 2018 to focus on his mayoral campaign.

2018 Taipei City mayoral election

Filmmaking
Yao retired from politics after finishing third behind Ko Wen-je and Ting Shou-chung, stating that he would begin working on documentaries about activists Peng Ming-min and Cheng Nan-jung. Yao's film production company released the crowdfunded film Untold Herstory in 2022, on which Yao was credited as producer.

References

External links

 

Living people
Fu Jen Catholic University alumni
1965 births
Politicians of the Republic of China on Taiwan from Hsinchu County
Democratic Progressive Party Members of the Legislative Yuan
Members of the 8th Legislative Yuan
Members of the 9th Legislative Yuan
Taipei Members of the Legislative Yuan
Taiwanese journalists
Taiwanese documentary filmmakers
Taiwanese film producers